Goyang Carrot Jumpers (Korean: 고양 캐롯 점퍼스) is a professional basketball club based in Goyang, South Korea which plays in the Korean Basketball League. Before the change of ownership in 2022, they were called Orions.

History

Dayone Sports era (2022–present) 
Rumours of a sale of Orion's stake in the club fuelled in early 2022. In April 2022, Orion confirmed that active negotiations with a potential buyer, Dayone Asset Management, a subsidiary of Daewoo Shipbuilding & Marine Engineering, was ongoing. The takeover was officially confirmed in May 2022, with the transfer of the entire club, players and staff to Dayone Asset Management. Kim Seung-gi, who won two championships with Anyang KGC, was appointed as the head coach of the team. On 24 June 2022, KBL officially approved the application of Dayone Sports as a member of the league, with a former player and coach, Hur Jae, being registered as the owner and manager of the club.

On 25 August 2022, Dayone Sports officially revealed that the club would be named Goyang Carrot Jumpers.

Team names 

 1996–1997: Dongyang Confectionary Basketball Team
 1997–2003: Daegu Tongyang Orions
 2003–2011: Daegu Orions
 2011–2015: Goyang Orions
 2015–2022: Goyang Orion Orions
 2022–present: Goyang Carrot Jumpers

Current roster

Enlisted players

Honours

Domestic

Korean Basketball League
KBL Championship
 Winners: 2001–02, 2015–16
 Runners-up: 2002–03

KBL Regular Season
 Winners: 2001–02, 2002–03
 Runners-up: 2016–17

Cups
KBL Pro-Am
 Winners: 2015

KBL Cup
 Winners: 2020

References

External links

 Official website 
 Asia-Basket.com profile

 
Korean Basketball League teams
Basketball teams in South Korea
Basketball teams established in 1996
Sport in Goyang
1996 establishments in South Korea